Temporal Analogues of Paradise is an album by bassist Jonas Hellborg, with guitarist Shawn Lane and drummer Jeff Sipe, released in 1996 through Day Eight Music; a remastered edition was reissued through Bardo Records in 2004.
It was recorded live at different locations in Sweden, France and Germany during the trio's extensive touring in 1995 and 1996.

Totally improvised, though still achieving a distinct musical dynamic and structure, the album marks a "headsplittingly magnificent" (Mac Randall, Musician Magazine) reference peak in rock/fusion history, not only through astounding technical virtuosity, but especially through an exploring, emotional flow of ideas that the artists are able to communicate, individually and as a group.

As acknowledged by the musicians themselves "Temporal Analogues of Paradise" is probably the most representative recording of the group.

Track listing

Personnel
Jonas Hellborg – bass, mixing, production
Shawn Lane – vocals, guitar
Jeff Sipe – drums, percussion
Timmy Fagerlund – engineering
Scud Noonan – mixing

References

External links
In Review: Hellborg/Lane/Sipe  "Temporal Analogues Of Paradise" at Guitar Nine Records

Jonas Hellborg albums
Shawn Lane albums
1996 live albums
Collaborative albums